Ibragim (İbrahim) is a rural locality (a village) in Starokuktovsky Selsoviet, Ilishevsky District, Bashkortostan, Russia. The population was 132 as of 2010. There are 3 streets.

Geography 
Ibragim is located 17 km north of Verkhneyarkeyevo (the district's administrative centre) by road. Krasny Oktyabr is the nearest rural locality.

References 

Rural localities in Ilishevsky District